The 1984 UCI Road World Championships took place on 2 September 1984 in Barcelona, Catalonia, Spain. Only one race took place due to the Los Angeles Olympic Games.

Results

Medal table

External links 

 Men's results
 Women's results
  Results at sportpro.it

 
UCI Road World Championships by year
Uci Road World Championships, 1984
UCI Road World Championships
Cycling competitions in Spain
1984 in road cycling